Kasaan Peninsula lies between Clarence Strait and Kasaan Bay in the U.S. state of Alaska. It forms a cut out from the eastern coast of Prince of Wales Island on the south, and by Tolstoi Bay and Thome Bay on the north. The southern and western shore line is abrupt and almost unbroken, and has practically no shelter from southeasterly storms which sweep up Kasaan Bay. The northeastern coast of the peninsula also rises abruptly from the water, but is broken by a number of indentations, some of which form small harbors. The first discovery of copper deposits in the Ketchikan district was made by the Russians on the southern side of Kasaan Peninsula. Kasaan is the largest settlement on the peninsula.

Topography
Kasaan Peninsula is a promontory on the east side of Prince of Wales Island that includes about square miles. From Clarence Strait, it appears to be an island whose summits are highest near its central part and diminish in height toward the north and south. A neck of low land between the head of Kasaan Bay and the south end of Thorne Bay connects the peninsula with Prince of Wales Island. Kasaan Bay occupies the south end of this valley. In the northward extension of this valley and on the low pass south of Thorne Bay, there are many small lakes and morainal deposits.

Erosion
On Kasaan Peninsula, there are many flat areas, some of them containing small lakes, and the mountain slopes themselves are interrupted by benches or terraces, which occur at different elevations and at rather regular intervals above sea level. These benches represent levels of erosion. Forelands at this height are especially prominent at the head of Kasaan Bay and on the adjacent islands. Such flats occur just north of Grindall Point; on the hills just north of Kasaan; northeast of the Haida mine, where the flat is covered by a lake; on both the east and west slopes of Tolstoi Bay; and southwest of Thorne Bay, where there are two large lakes. The surface of the lake just east of Lake Three, at the head of Kasaan Bay, and that of the lake below the Goodro mine are also at this elevation.

At this level also there are lakes, from which small streams flow down through gulch-like valleys to lower levels. At this altitude, there are terraces along the north slope of the southwest half of the peninsula, flats south of Hadley, a low pass across the peninsula southwest of Lyman Anchorage, and the lakes and flats on the divide from Windfall Harbor to Tolstoi Bay and east of the It mine.

Glaciation
The mountain mass of Kasaan Peninsula exhibits characteristic glaciated topography. The entire peninsula was at one time overridden by ice streams is evident from the glacial erratics which lie on the highest summits, the moraine deposits which occur on the lower levels, and the many basins which stand at various elevations on the mountain slopes and are now occupied by lakes. During the period in which this area lay beneath the ice many of the minor topographic features, such as the earlier erosion level, were partly destroyed. Some of the valleys were more deeply eroded, lake basins were formed, and wide areas of glacial silt and debris were laid down. This section of the ice stream is well represented in the northern extension of the valley of Kasaan Bay, which is occupied by a chain of connecting lakes, on the sides of which thick beds of glacial clay and debris have been exposed by subsequent stream erosion. This valley probably represents a preglacial river floor, and only the lake basins and minor physiographic features can be attributed to ice erosion. Erosive action subsequent to the ice period has formed the gulches and ravines which are everywhere prominent on the mountain slopes. Another noteworthy feature of Kasaan Peninsula is its precipitous southwest slope, which is much steeper than that on the northeast. This difference may be due to the fact that the ice stream remained longer in the valley of Kasaan Bay than in that of Clarence Strait, the action of the ice tending to deepen the valley and at the same time to protect the mountain slopes from surface erosion.

Flora
Kasaan Peninsula is densely forested with spruce and hemlock, principally hemlock, which extends to elevations of  The timber, especially that on the southwest side, toward Grindall Point, is large and straight. The mountain side is steep down to salt water. The mountain summits and ridges above timber line are fairly open and bear relatively little vegetation as compared with that of the densely forested lower levels, groups of scrubby pine and juniper and a low berry bush being the principal plants found.

Conservation
Prince of Wales Island was included in the Tongass National Forest, but in 1908 that portion of Kasaan Peninsula, which lies south of the Hole in the Wall, was taken out of the national forest.

References

Peninsulas of Alaska
Landforms of Prince of Wales–Hyder Census Area, Alaska